Aldo Donadello (born 19 April 1953) is an Italian racing cyclist. He rode in the 1979 Tour de France.

References

External links
 

1953 births
Living people
Italian male cyclists
Place of birth missing (living people)
People from Marostica
Cyclists from the Province of Vicenza